Arasanagaripattinam  is a village in the  
Avadaiyarkoilrevenue block of Pudukkottai district, Tamil Nadu, India.

Demographics 

As per the 2001 census, Arasanagaripattinam had a total population of 
8174 with 3969 males and 4205 females. Out of the total population  5503 people were literate.

Arasanagaripattinam: For a Chola king, the place where the Special Action Soldiers stayed to intimidate the short-lived monarch who refused to pay the bribe, Arasan Adi means the king's soldiers.  Maruvi became known as 'Arasanari' today as 'Arasanari' in the course of 'Arasan Adi'.

 Pondicherry is a planned state in India.  Pudukottai in the districts.  The village of "Arasanagaripattinam" is proud to be the first and most ancient village among the villages built and built on the same model.

 Every street is a street with no curves at even intervals.  You can see the sea at any street corner.  This is a unique feature not found in any of the other villages along the East Coast.

 The pond called 'Bediya Dhammam' is one of the wonders of the royal city.  Like the valley, the pool was created exclusively for women to bathe secretly.  It is true to be astonished when we see that our rule in the protection of women was precision.

 In the royal city, the waves of the sea, the noise of the arbor, the depths of fear.  That is why the woman is described as the sea.  There has been a controversy since the Sangam period over whether the sea is bigger or Barry's mercy is bigger.  Nowhere else can you look clean to enjoy the long stretch of sea.  The difference here, as in other fishing villages, is the unwritten law that keyboards are not allowed.  Many villages have lost their identity and are one of the key boats for cultural degradation.  That's why these people are so sure that keyboards are not allowed to this day.

 As far as this village is concerned, there are many people who have contributed to the conservation.  There are those who have shouldered the security of the town.  I still remember so many people with gratitude.

References

Villages in Pudukkottai district